Following are the results of the duet technical routine synchronised swimming competition at the 2009 World Aquatics Championships held in Rome, Italy from July 17 to August 2, 2009.

Results

Green denotes finalists

External links
Preliminary  Results
 Final Standings

Synchronised swimming at the 2009 World Aquatics Championships